WHDQ (106.1 FM, "Q106") is a radio station broadcasting a classic rock format. Licensed to Claremont, New Hampshire, United States, the station serves the Lebanon-Rutland-White River Junction area.  The station is owned by Jeffrey Shapiro's Great Eastern Radio.  The station's transmitter is located atop Mount Ascutney in Vermont.  WHDQ's signal is also broadcast over a translator—W294AB (106.7 FM) in Hanover, New Hampshire—and a booster—WHDQ-FM1 in Rutland, Vermont

History
Q106 has arguably one of the richest and most colorful histories of any radio station in northern New England. The station went through a couple of formats. The station first went through a couple of formats. The station first went under both AOR and MOR formats from the early 1970s until 1983, when the station flipped to a Top 40/CHR format. For almost ten years in total beginning in 1983, it was the area's dominant CHR powerhouse as both WECM and WHDQ until March 1993 when the station dropped CHR and flipped back to AOR. Q106 was one of the first radio stations to carry the Imus in the Morning show, and one of the first stations to reinstate the show upon Imus' return to the airwaves in December 2007.  

Q106 is the first FM station in New Hampshire to sign on the air as WTSV-FM at 102.1 in 1948 as an affiliate of the Granite State Network. The station used the call sign WECM from 1972 to 1985 while broadcasting from 106.1 FM and went under the names of "Stereo 106" and "M-106". During that time it simulcasted some shows on former Top 40/NBC Radio Network/CBS Radio station WTSV 1230 AM and was located on Washington Street in Claremont, next to the AM radio tower.

WHDQ, along with 29 other stations in northern New England formerly owned by Nassau Broadcasting Partners, was purchased at a bankruptcy auction by Carlisle Capital Corporation, a company controlled by Bill Binnie (owner of WBIN-TV in Derry), on May 22, 2012. The station, and 12 of the other stations, were then acquired by Vertical Capital Partners, controlled by Jeff Shapiro. The deal was completed on November 30, 2012. The Vertical Capital Partners stations were transferred to Shapiro's existing Great Eastern Radio group on January 1, 2013.

Personalities
 Greg and The Morning Buzz
 House
 Elise Valentine
 Traci Fulton
 Gregg Parrotto

Past personnel
 Dave Ashton
 Ken Barlow
 Big Joe
 Ted Bilodeau
 Bill Bogle (WECM)
 Bob Cady
 Dave Cooper
 Steve Cormier (WECM)
 Doug Daniels
 Doug Danzing - hosted 1st Sunday AM Oldies show
 Guy Dark
 John Dodge (WECM)
 Leif Erickson
 Bob Flint (WECM)
 Jen Foxx
 Tom Hoyt
 Peg Jett
 Dru Johnson
 Don Matsen
 Carl Metcalf (WECM)
 Ross Michaels
 Chris Mitchell
 Laurie Nelson (WECM)
 Lisa Peakes
 Jason Place
 Bev Porter (WECM)
 Rob Riley
 Bob Rivers (WECM)
 Rick Ross
 Brian Ryea
 Gary Seem (WECM)
 Sharon Steele
 Wally Wilcox
 Chris Picard
 Griffin Wert
 Art Steinberg
 Ken Webbley
 Michael Witthaus (WECM)
 Bruce Zeman
 Zip Zipfel (WECM)

Translators and booster
WHDQ also broadcasts on the following translators and booster:

References

External links

HDQ
Claremont, New Hampshire
Classic rock radio stations in the United States
Radio stations established in 1947
1947 establishments in New Hampshire